Tiger Moon was a disco/freestyle Miami-based group that is known for their 1987 song Something Tells Me. The song has appeared in several Gay, Miami and freestyle compilations. The track was sampled by Prince in his song Thieves In the Temple and by other artists.  Something Tells Me was used in the 1988 movie Frantic  during a scene in which Harrison Ford's character, Richard Walker, enters The Blue Parrot looking for Dédé Martin.

Discography

Singles
Something Tells Me (Atlantic Records, 1987)
Louie, Louie (Vision Records (US), 1988)

Compilation Appearances
Gay Classics Vol. XII - Over And Out (SoBe Music, 1996) / Track : Something Tells Me
Miami Beatz (OS Music, 1996) / Track : Something Tells Me
Miami Dance Classics Volume 1 - "Jam On Me" (MIA Records, 1996) / Track : Something Tells Me
Miami Freestyle (Vision Records (US), 1996) / Track : Something Tells Me
Gay Classics Mega Mix Volume 1 (SoBe Music, 1997) / Track : Something Tells Me
Ishology (Foxy - OXO - Company B) (RE Records, 2005) / Track : Something Tells Me
Freestyle Highlights Vol. 1 (Soundland Grupo Musica, ?) / Track : Something Tells Me

External links
Tiger Moon Discography at Discogs

References

Musical groups disestablished in 1988
Musical groups established in 1987
Musical groups from Miami